Jakub Kastelovič (born 14 June 1995) is a Slovak football midfielder who plays for SK Dolne Vestenice.

Club career

Spartak Myjava
On 14 August 2014, he signed a contract with Spartak Myjava. He made his professional debut for Spartak Myjava against ŠK Slovan Bratislava on 23 August 2014.

References

External links
 Spartak Myjava profile
 
 Eurofotbal profile
 Futbalnet profile

1995 births
Living people
Slovak footballers
Association football defenders
FC Slovan Liberec players
Expatriate footballers in the Czech Republic
Spartak Myjava players
FK Slovan Duslo Šaľa players
FC ViOn Zlaté Moravce players
Slovak Super Liga players